The Lonesome Rhodes were an American singer-songwriter duo of the 1960s.  Sandy and Donna Rhodes were discovered in Memphis, Tennessee, in 1965 and released five singles and one LP for RCA Records.  The recordings were produced by Chet Atkins and Felton Jarvis.

They later went on to form the group RCR with Charles Chalmers and had minor hits in the U.S. with the songs "Scandal" and "Give It to You" in 1980.

Discography
-Singles-
"Make Like the Wind (And Blow)" / "Love Is" (October 1966)
"The Least You Could Have Done" / "Nothin' But Heartaches Here" (March 1967)
"That's Why" / "The Delight Of My Day" (September 1967)
"Mister" / "The Day Love Comes (Finding You)" (December 1967)
"The Lights Of Dallas" / "I'm Missing You" (1968)

-LPs-

"Sandy & Donna" (1967)

References

External links

American vocal groups
Sibling musical duos